John Howard Trautwein (born August 7, 1962) is a former relief pitcher in Major League Baseball who played briefly for the Boston Red Sox during the  season. Listed at 6' 3", 205 lb., Trautwein batted and threw right-handed.

Amateur career
Trautwein attended Northwestern University, and in 1982 he played collegiate summer baseball with the Chatham A's of the Cape Cod Baseball League. He earned a degree in chemistry from Northwestern, was Academic All Big-10 and captained Northwestern's most successful baseball team in school history in 1984.

Professional career
In 1984, Trautwein was purchased by the Montreal Expos from the Helena Gold Sox of the Pioneer League. Then, in 1987 he was obtained by Boston from the Expos in the Rule 5 draft, and spent the entire 1988 season as a member of the Red Sox pitching staff.

In 1995, Trautwein played for a team in Bournemouth, England.

Personal
Trautwein currently lives in the Atlanta, Georgia, area with his wife Susie, and their three children.  He is currently the chief customer officer of Source Support Services, Inc., where he formerly was president and COO for 10 years. Source Support is a global IT services organization headquartered in Lawrenceville, Georgia.  Trautwein was formerly director of sales and marketing for Zellweger Analytics for 13 years, living in Munich, Germany; Poole, England; and Johns Creek, (Atlanta), Georgia.

John and Susie Trautwein are recipients of the Presidential Point Of Light Award, for their work in founding the non-profit Will To Live Foundation, Inc., a 501(c)(3) public charity that is dedicated to spreading the awareness and education of teen suicide in America and around the world.  John and Susie started the foundation after the suicide death of their oldest child, and son, Will, who killed himself in October 2010.

Trautwein is an accomplished public speaker and gives over 100 speeches a year on teen suicide awareness to schools, teams and organizations around the country.

Trautwein wrote a book about his son Will's suicide, and the creation of the Will To Live Foundation, My Living Will: A Fathers story of Loss & Hope which was published in December 2014.

See also
1988 Boston Red Sox season

References

External links
The Will To Live Foundation
Source Support Services
The Baseball Cube
Baseball Reference
Retrosheet

1962 births
Living people
American expatriate sportspeople in England
Baseball players from Pennsylvania
Boston Red Sox players
Burlington Expos players
Chatham Anglers players
Helena Gold Sox players
Jacksonville Expos players
Major League Baseball pitchers
Northwestern Wildcats baseball players
Pawtucket Red Sox players
West Palm Beach Expos players